Dag Castle is a historical castle located in Ahar County in East Azerbaijan Province, The longevity of this fortress dates back to the Sasanian Empire.

References 

Castles in Iran
Sasanian castles